Polku (also Romanized as Polkū, Palaku, and Polekū; also known as Paluka, Palūkūh, and Polūkū) is a village in Howmeh Rural District, in the Central District of Rasht County, Gilan Province, Iran. At the 2006 census, its population was 976, in 285 families.

References 

Populated places in Rasht County